Thomas H. Bussey (February 25, 1857 Troy, Rensselaer County, New York – March 9, 1937, New York City) was an American politician from New York.

Life

Bussey attended Rensselaer Polytechnic Institute. He was superintendent of a knitting mill in Perry. He was at times Supervisor of the Town of Perry; President of the Village of Perry; and Chairman of the Board of Supervisors of Wyoming County, New York.

Bussey was a member of the New York State Senate (44th D.) from 1911 to 1914, sitting in the 134th, 135th, 136th and 137th New York State Legislatures. He was a member of the New York State Commission for the Panama–Pacific International Exposition in 1915.

Death
He died on March 9, 1937, in New York City and was buried in Pipersville, Pennsylvania.

Sources
 Official New York from Cleveland to Hughes by Charles Elliott Fitch (Hurd Publishing Co., New York and Buffalo, 1911, Vol. IV; pg. 367)
 State of New York at the Panama–Pacific International Exposition, San Francisco, California, 1915 (Albany, 1916; pg. 24)
 MRS. THOMAS H. BUSSEY in Perry Herald on April 9, 1941

1857 births
1937 deaths
Republican Party New York (state) state senators
Politicians from Troy, New York
People from Perry, New York
Town supervisors in New York (state)
Rensselaer Polytechnic Institute alumni